William Maxwell (12 April 1882 – 12 October 1917) was an Australian rules footballer who played with Melbourne in the Victorian Football League (VFL).

Family
The son of Charles Frederick Maxwell (1849–1889), and Eliza Jane Maxwell (1852–1925), née Mooney, William Maxwell was born at Caulfield, Victoria on 12 April 1882.

Education
He was educated at Scotch College, in St Kilda, formerly known as the Hofwyl School, an entirely different institution from the Scotch College, then in East Melbourne, now in Hawthorn.

Football
Recruited from Collegians in 1909, he played his first match for Melbourne against Essendon on 10 July 1909.

His second, and last match for Melbourne, in which he kicked his only VFL goal, was against Geelong on 21 August 1909.

Military service
Maxwell served as a lieutenant with the 38th Battalion during World War I. He left Australia on 20 June 1916 on the HMAT Runic (A54).

He was wounded in the Battle of Messines on 7 June 1917, but recovered from his injuries and rejoined his battalion three months later.

Death
Maxwell was killed in action on 12 October 1917 at the First Battle of Passchendaele in Belgium.

He has no known grave, and is commemorated at the Menin Gate Memorial to the Missing in Ypres, Belgium.

See also
 List of Victorian Football League players who died on active service

Notes

References
 
 World War One Embarkation Roll: Second Lieutenant William Maxwell, collection of the Australian War Memorial.
 World War One Nominal Roll: Lieutenant William Maxwell, collection of the Australian War Memorial.
 World War One Service Record: Lieutenant William Maxwell, National Archives of Australia.
 Australian Red Cross Society Wounded and Missing Enquiry Bureau files, 1914-18 War: 1DRL/0428: Lieutenant William Maxwell, in the collection of the Australian War Museum. 
 Australia's Roll of Honor: 317th Casualty List: Severely Wounded: Victoria, The Age, (Tuesday, 3 July 1917), p.6.
 359th Casualty List: Killed in Action, The Herald, (Thursday, 29 November 1917), p.9.
 Lieutenant William Maxwell, Commonwealth War Graves Commission.
 Roll of Honour: Lieutenant William Maxwell, Australian War Memorial.

External links 
 
 
 Bill Maxwell, at Demonwiki.

1882 births
1917 deaths
Australian rules footballers from Melbourne
Australian Rules footballers: place kick exponents
Melbourne Football Club players
Australian military personnel killed in World War I
People from Caulfield, Victoria
Military personnel from Melbourne
Collegians Football Club players